Silvia Edith Maria Neid (born 2 May 1964) is a retired professional German football player and manager. She is one of the most successful players in German women's football, having won seven national championships and six DFB-Pokal trophies. Between 2005 and 2016, Neid served as the head coach of the Germany women's national football team. She was the FIFA World Women's Coach of the Year in 2010, 2013 and 2016.

Playing career
Neid's career as a player began at SV Schlierstadt, later renamed to Klinge Seckach. She stayed with the club until 1983 when she signed up with SSG Bergisch Gladbach, then the dominant team in German football. She won the double with SSG in 1984, but moved to TSV Siegen after a title-less 1985 season. The club enjoyed its most successful years during Neid's tenure, winning six championships and five cups. When Gerd Neuser stopped coaching Siegen in 1994, Neid requested a transfer to SG Praunheim, but the club refused. Neid retired after the 1996 season.

As a German international, Neid made her debut on 10 November 1982 against Switzerland. She scored two goals in the match, the first of which came just one minute after she had entered the pitch. Neid won the UEFA Women's Championship three times in succession between 1989 and 1995, and reached the final of the 1995 FIFA Women's World Cup. Her last game was at the 1996 Summer Olympics in Atlanta against Brazil.

International goals

Managerial career
Immediately after retiring from active football, Neid took a coaching job with the German women's national team. She managed the under-19 team, which won the 2004 World Championship and finished runner-up at the Women's Championship under her guidance.

Neid served as assistant manager of the senior national team under Tina Theune-Meyer, before succeeding Theune-Meyer as head coach on 20 June 2005. She coached the team to victory at the 2007 FIFA Women's World Cup, defeating Brazil 2–0 in the final, and the 2016 Summer Olympics. Neid stepped down as head coach in August 2016.

Managerial record

Honours

Player
SV Bergisch Gladbach 09
Bundesliga: 1984
DFB-Pokal: 1984

TSV Siegen
Bundesliga: 1987, 1990, 1991, 1992, 1994, 1996
DFB-Pokal: 1986, 1987, 1988, 1989, 1993

Germany Women
UEFA Women's Championship: 1989, 1991, 1995

Manager
Germany Women Youth
UEFA Women's Under-19 Championship: 2000, 2001, 2002

FIFA U-20 Women's World Cup: 2004
Germany Women
FIFA Women's World Cup: 2007
UEFA Women's Championship: 2009, 2013
Summer Olympic Games: Bronze medal: 2008, Gold medal: 2016
Algarve Cup: 2006, 2012, 2014

Individual
FIFA World Coach of the Year for Women's Football: 2010, 2013, 2016

References

1964 births
Living people
German women's footballers
Germany women's international footballers
Germany women's national football team managers
Footballers at the 1996 Summer Olympics
Recipients of the Cross of the Order of Merit of the Federal Republic of Germany
Recipients of the Order of Merit of Baden-Württemberg
FIFA Century Club
1991 FIFA Women's World Cup players
1995 FIFA Women's World Cup players
2007 FIFA Women's World Cup managers
2011 FIFA Women's World Cup managers
2015 FIFA Women's World Cup managers
FIFA Women's World Cup-winning managers
German women's football managers
Women's association football midfielders
Olympic footballers of Germany
UEFA Women's Championship-winning players
UEFA Women's Championship-winning managers
Female association football managers
Olympic gold medalists for Germany
People from Neckar-Odenwald-Kreis
Sportspeople from Karlsruhe (region)
Footballers from Baden-Württemberg